Karnal district is one of the 22 districts of Haryana, a state in North India which constitutes the National Capital Region (NCR) of the country. The city of Karnal is a part of the National Capital Region (NCR) and is the administrative headquarters of the district.

As it lies on National highway 44 (old NH-1), it has a well connected transport system to the nearby major cities like Delhi and Chandigarh. Karnal District is also well connected via railways. Karnal Junction lies on Delhi-Kalka line and major trains stops at this station. The district headquarter also has a small aerodrome known as karnal airport.

Sub-Divisions
The Karnal district is headed by an IAS officer of the rank of Deputy Commissioner (DC) who is the chief executive officer of the district. The district is divided into 4 sub-divisions, each headed by a Sub-Divisional Magistrate (SDM): Karnal, Indri, Assandh and Gharaunda.

Revenue tehsils
The above 4 sub-divisions are divided into 5 revenue tehsils, namely, Karnal, Indri, Nilokheri, Gharaunda & Assandh and 3 sub-tehsil namely Nigdhu, Nissing and Ballah.

Assembly constituencies
The Karnal district is divided into 5 Vidhan Sabha constituencies:
 Nilokheri
 Indri
 Karnal
 Gharaunda
 Assandh
Karnal district is a part of Karnal (Lok Sabha constituency).

Demographics

According to the 2011 census Karnal district has a population of 1,505,324, roughly equal to the nation of Gabon or the US state of Hawaii. This gives it a ranking of 333rd in India (out of a total of 640). Its population growth rate over the decade 2001-2011 was  18.22%. Karnal has a sex ratio of 996 females for every 1,000 males, and a literacy rate of 74.73%. Scheduled Castes made up 22.56% of the population.

Religion

Languages 

At the time of the 2011 Census of India, 54.28% of the population in the district spoke Hindi, 32.04 Haryanvi, 10.86% Punjabi and 1.06% Multani as their first language.

People from Karnal District

 Kalpana Chawla, First Indo-American woman astronaut. In 2003, Chawla was one of the seven crew members that died in the Space Shuttle Columbia disaster
Nawabzada Liaquat Ali Khan, First Prime Minister of Pakistan.
Vikramjeet Virk, Indian actor. 
Navdeep Saini, Indian cricketer.  
Manohar Lal Khattar, Current Chief Minister of Haryana
Kuldeep Sharma, Indian politician.
Harwinder Kalyan, Indian politician.
Karan Dev Kamboj, Indian politician.

Villages
 

Chakda
Hemda
Kaimla
Nagla Roran
Salwan
Padha :The ROYAL VILLAGE

See also
Gagsina

References

External links

 Official website

 
Districts of Haryana